John Clennett (born 25 January 1950) is a former Australian rules footballer who played with Melbourne in the Victorian Football League (VFL).

Notes

External links 		

		
		
1950 births		
Living people
Australian rules footballers from Tasmania		
Melbourne Football Club players
Sandy Bay Football Club players